Little Ghost Nebula, also known as NGC 6369, is a planetary nebula in the constellation Ophiuchus. It was discovered by William Herschel.

Round and planet-shaped, the nebula is also relatively faint. The high energy radiation from the central white dwarf causes the surrounding nebula to emit light. The nebula's main ring structure is about a light-year across and the glow from ionized oxygen, hydrogen, and nitrogen atoms are colored blue, green, and red respectively.

The Little Ghost Nebula should not be confused with the Ghost Nebula (Sh2-136) or the Ghost Head Nebula (NGC 2080).

The central star of the planetary nebula has a spectral type of [WO3], indicating a spectrum similar to that of an oxygen-rich Wolf–Rayet star. An analysis of Gaia data suggests that the it may be a binary system. The central star was monitored by Kepler, but it was not found to be variable.

References

  NGC 6369

External links 
 
 Little Ghost Nebula data sheet, altitude charts, sky map and related objects - Deep Sky Objects Browser
 Little Ghost Nebula amateur astrophotography - Deep Sky Objects Browser

Planetary nebulae
Ophiuchus (constellation)
NGC objects